Honeycomb Glacier may mean:

Honeycomb Glacier (Antarctica), a glacier in Antarctica
Honeycomb Glacier (Washington), a glacier in Washington, USA